In Taiwan, Q is a culinary term for the ideal texture of many foods, such as noodles or boba, and fish balls and fish cakes. Sometimes translated as "chewy", the texture has been described as "The Asian version of al-dente [...] soft but not mushy." Another translation is "springy and bouncy".

The term originates from the Taiwanese Hokkien word , which has a sound similar to the letter "Q" in English, and has since been adopted by other forms of Chinese, such as Mandarin.

It also appears in a doubled more intense form, "QQ".

References

Culinary terminology
Taiwanese cuisine